Ruth Dancia Penn,  (born 1951) is a British Virgin Islands politician and former Deputy Governor of the British Virgin Islands from 20 September 2004 to 1 April 2007. She also formerly served as the Attorney General of the British Virgin Islands from 1992 to 1999.

Penn was the first woman to be appointed Deputy Governor, and the first British Virgin Islander (and so far, the only one) to serve as Attorney General.

She served briefly as the acting Governor of the British Virgin Islands during 2006 in the gap between Tom Macan leaving office and David Pearey taking up his appointment.

Professionally Dancia Penn goes by her maiden name, but her legal name has been changed to Mrs Dancia Penn-Sallah since her marriage to Captain Sallah, former Registrar of Ships in the British Virgin Islands.

Politics

In July 2007, Penn announced her candidacy to stand for the 8th district in the General Election held on 20 August 2007 in the British Virgin Islands on behalf of the Virgin Islands Party (VIP).  She was elected to office, defeating the incumbent Lloyd Black, and she was appointed the Minister of Health and Welfare, and as the Deputy Premier of the British Virgin Islands.  However, in the General Election held on 7 November 2011 she lost her 8th district seat to Marlon Penn.

There had been considerable speculation after the 2007 that when the then Premier of the British Virgin Islands, Ralph T. O'Neal retired, Penn would be named as his successor as leader of the Virgin Islands Party, and would thereby become the first female Premier in the Territory.  Her defeat in the 2011 election precluded (or at least deferred) that possibility.  Penn subsequently ran again for the legislature in the 2015 General Election, but ran as an independent rather than as a Virgin Islands Party candidate, and ran at-large rather than for the 8th district.  She was not elected in 2015.

Judicial

In 2007, Penn took up a temporary appointment as an acting judge of the Court of Appeal of the Eastern Caribbean Supreme Court. She was required to give up that appointment shortly after formally entering politics as a candidate.

Electoral history

References

Offices

Sources 
 Island Sun

1951 births
Living people
Deputy Governors of the British Virgin Islands
Virgin Islands Party politicians
British Virgin Islands women in politics
Governors of the British Virgin Islands
Officers of the Order of the British Empire
20th-century British Virgin Islands lawyers
British Virgin Islands judges
Eastern Caribbean Supreme Court justices
British women judges
British Virgin Islands politicians
British Virgin Islands Queen's Counsel
Attorneys general of the British Virgin Islands
20th-century British women politicians
21st-century British women politicians
British judges of international courts and tribunals
Female justice ministers